The  was a Japanese domain of the Edo period, located in Bitchū Province (modern-day Okayama Prefecture).

List of lords

Tenryō, 1600-1616

Kobori clan (office of Bitchū Daikan)

Masatsugu
Masakazu

Ikeda clan, 1617-1641 (Tozama; 65,000 koku)

Nagayuki
Nagatsune

Mizunoya clan, 1642-1693 (Tozama; 50,000 koku)

Katsutaka
Katsumune
Katsuyoshi

Andō clan, 1695-1711 (Fudai; 65,000 koku)

Shigehiro
Nobutomo

Ishikawa clan, 1711-1744 (Fudai; 60,000 koku)

Fusayoshi

Itakura clan, 1744-1871 (Fudai; 50,000->20,000 koku)

Katsuzumi
Katsutake
Katsuyori
Katsumasa
Katsuaki
Katsutsune
Katsukiyo
Katsusuke

References
 Japanese Wikipedia article on Bitchū-Matsuyama (22 Sept. 2007)
 Bitchū-Matsuyama on "Edo 300 HTML" (22 Sept. 2007)

Domains of Japan